Saltcoats and Stevenston is one of the nine wards used to elect members of the North Ayrshire council. It was originally created in 2007 and elected four Councillors; as its name suggests, it covered the adjoining small towns of Saltcoats on the Firth of Clyde coast and Stevenston just inland. A national boundary review prior to the 2017 local elections saw the ward abolished in favour of two three-member wards for each town; however this was reversed after the introduction of the Islands (Scotland) Act 2018: North Ayrshire's wards were re-organised for the 2022 election with Saltcoats and Stevenston re-instated, now electing five members. In 2020, the combined population of the two smaller wards was 25,513.

Councillors

Election Results

2022 Election
2022 North Ayrshire Council election

Source:

2017 Election
2017 North Ayrshire Council election

2012 Election
2012 North Ayrshire Council election

2007 Election
2007 North Ayrshire Council election

2011 by-election
A by-election arose in the Saltcoats and Stevenston ward following the resignation of the Labour Party's David Munn, and Jim Montgomorie held the seat for Labour on 25 August 2011.

References

Wards of North Ayrshire
Ardrossan−Saltcoats−Stevenston
2017 disestablishments in Scotland
2022 establishments in Scotland